Auburn Junction is an unincorporated community in Jackson Township, DeKalb County, Indiana.

History
Auburn Junction was at the junction of three railroads near Auburn, hence the name.

At Auburn Junction, the Baltimore & Ohio Railroad, the Eel River Railroad, and the Fort Wayne and Jackson Railroad all met at grade. The only thing that remains of Auburn Junction today is the B&O trackage, now owned by CSX and a mile section of the Ft Wayne and Jackson that serves as an industrial spur to two local businesses, also known as the City of Auburn Port Authority.

A post office was established at Auburn Junction in 1884, and remained in operation until it was discontinued in 1931.

Geography

References

Unincorporated communities in DeKalb County, Indiana
Unincorporated communities in Indiana